Morova subfasciata, also known as the Muehlenbeckia stem gall moth, is a species of moth in the family Thyrididae first described by Francis Walker in 1865. It is endemic to New Zealand.

References

Thyrididae
Moths described in 1865
Moths of New Zealand
Endemic fauna of New Zealand
Taxa named by Francis Walker (entomologist)
Endemic moths of New Zealand